Albrecht von Wallenstein (1583–1634) was a Bohemian military leader and politician.

Wallenstein may also refer to:

Works on the life of Albrecht von Wallenstein:
 Wallenstein (trilogy of plays), an 1800 work by Friedrich Schiller
 Wallenstein (novel), a 1920 work by Alfred Döblin
 Wallenstein (film), a 1925 German silent historical film
 Wallenstein, an 1876 opera by Luigi Denza
 Wallenstein (Weinberger), a 1937 opera by Jaromir Weinberger
 Wallenstein (band), a German rock band
 Wallenstein (board game), a medium-weight German-style board game
 Wallenstein, Ontario

People with the surname
 Esther Wallenstein (1846–1903), German-American care worker
 Alfred Wallenstein (1898–1983), American cellist and conductor
 Herbert J. Wallenstein (1917–1996), American legal officer
 Peter Wallenstein, American author and history professor
 Catarina Wallenstein (born 1986), Portuguese actress

See also
Wallerstein (disambiguation)